Ughetto Bertucci (18 October 1907 – 25 June 1966) was an Italian film and stage actor. He appeared in more than 40 films between 1945 and 1960.

Life and career 
He was born and died in Rome, Italy. A fruit vendor in a Roman market square, he was noticed by the director Mario Mattoli who cast him as a fruit vendor in his comedy-drama Life Begins Anew. Following the commercial success of the film, without abandoning his  market stall, Bertucci started a prodigious career as a character actor, usually cast in humorous roles. He also made occasionally appearances in avanspettacolo.

Partial filmography

 Life Begins Anew (1945) - Righetto
 Before Him All Rome Trembled (1946) - Mechanic Remo (uncredited)
 Last Love (1947)
 L'onorevole Angelina (1947) - Benedetto Zampaglione
 The Two Orphans (1947) - Il generale (uncredited)
 Fear and Sand (1948) - Chauffeur
 Toto Tours Italy (1948) - Armando
 The Firemen of Viggiù (1949) - Un pompiere
 Adam and Eve (1949) - Buck
 Little Lady (1949) - Un ladro
 The Merry Widower (1950) - Il primo portiere del tabarin
 The Hawk of the Nile (1950) - (uncredited)
 The Elusive Twelve (1950) - Il cameriere
 The Lion of Amalfi (1950) - Luciano
 Totò Tarzan (1950) - Capo stazione romano
 Toto the Sheik (1950) - Ludovico, l'autista
 Arrivano i nostri (1951) - Cameriere di 'Chez Moi'
 Milano miliardaria (1951) - Ughetto, un parruchiere
 Accidents to the Taxes!! (1951) - Segretario indiano
 Toto the Third Man (1951) - Lamberto - il primo cacciatore
 Revenge of Black Eagle (1951) - Kurin
 Una bruna indiavolata! (1951) - Camionista
 The Steamship Owner (1951) - L'autista di Peonio
 Era lui... sì! sì! (1951) - Un fattorino
 Tizio, Caio, Sempronio (1951) - Un partigiano di Pompeo
 Auguri e figli maschi! (1951) - Barman (uncredited)
 Seven Hours of Trouble (1951) - Annibale
 Sardinian Vendetta (1952) - Terzo fratello Leoni
 Five Paupers in an Automobile (1952) - Il parcheggiatore
 Noi cannibali (1953)
 Two Nights with Cleopatra (1954) - Un mercante
 Days of Love (1954)
 An American in Rome (1954) - Autista del camioncino (uncredited)
 Toto Seeks Peace (1954) - Testimone
 L'ultimo amante (1955) - Un testimone al commissariato
 La catena dell'odio (1955)
 Eighteen Year Olds (1955) - Il giradiniere
 Storia di una minorenne (1956)
 I giorni più belli (1956) - Il gelataio
 Poveri ma belli (1957) - The Greengrocer in Piazza Navona (uncredited)
 Il diavolo nero (1957)
 Pretty But Poor (1957) - 'Pulce'
 Peppino, le modelle e chella là (1957)
 Il cocco di mamma (1958) - The Bus Conductor
 Gentlemen Are Born (1960)
 Appuntamento a Ischia (1960) - The Taxi Driver in Rome (uncredited)
 Sua Eccellenza si fermò a mangiare (1961) - The Short Fascist with Fez

References

External links

1907 births
1966 deaths
Italian male film actors
20th-century Italian male actors